Events in the year 1974 in Belgium.

Incumbents

Monarch: Baudouin
Prime Minister: Edmond Leburton (to 25 April); Leo Tindemans (from 25 April)

Events
 23 January – Fire at boarding school in Heusden kills 23 teenagers.
 10 March – 1974 Belgian general election
 24 June – Robert-Joseph Mathen becomes Bishop of Namur

Art and architecture

Buildings
 Jacques Cuisinier's Brusilia building in Schaerbeek completed (begun 1970)

Births
19 October – Peter Evrard, singer, winner of Idool 2003

Deaths

References

 
1970s in Belgium
Belgium
Years of the 20th century in Belgium
Belgium